Vittorio Mussolini (27 September 1916 – 12 June 1997) was an Italian film critic and producer.  He was also the second child of Italian dictator Benito Mussolini. However, he was the first officially acknowledged son of Mussolini, with his second wife Rachele; his older half-brother was never officially acknowledged by Mussolini's fascist regime.

Biography
Vittorio Mussolini was born in Milan, Lombardy, Kingdom of Italy (Regno d'Italia). He married Milanese Orsola Buvoli (1914–2009), two years his senior. In January 1938, Mussolini and his wife announced the birth of their first child, a son, Guido, born in Rome.

In addition to producing films, Mussolini served as a Lieutenant (Tenente) in the Italian Royal Air Force (Regia Aeronautica). He participated in the Second Italo-Ethiopian War, the Spanish Civil War, and World War II. In Ethiopia, both he and his younger brother Bruno crewed bombers. Unlike his brother, Vittorio was not considered a serious pilot and described bombs as "budding roses" and killing as "exceptionally good fun".

In later years, Vittorio made much of his contact and friendship with left-wing and Jewish directors, writers, and film critics during the brief period in the late 1930s and the early 1940s, when he edited the journal Cinema. Openly leftist critics such as Michelangelo Antonioni were published in the magazine, and Vittorio even found lodgings for the distinguished German Jewish critic Rudolf Arnheim in the Roman Mussolini residence, Villa Torlonia; with another Jewish friend, Orlando Piperno, Vittorio took part in the Mille Miglia car race, finishing tenth.

Mussolini worked with many of Italy's best film directors, such as Federico Fellini, Roberto Rossellini, and Michelangelo Antonioni.

Vittorio was briefly involved with Hal Roach in a company, R.A.M. Pictures (for "Roach and Mussolini"), but Roach bought himself out of the deal after being heavily ostracized in Hollywood.

He was the editor of the film journal Cinema and was involved with the Italian film studio Cinecittà.

After the war, Mussolini emigrated to Argentina, but later returned to Italy.

Vittorio Mussolini died on 12 June 1997, at 80, in a Rome clinic after a long illness.

Publications
Mussolini was the author of a 1973 book on the women in his father's life entitled Mussolini: The Tragic Women in His Life.

Filmography

See also
 Ida Dalser - Vittorio Mussolini's older half brother's mother.

References

External links

1916 births
1997 deaths
Children of national leaders
Italian film critics
Italian people of the Spanish Civil War
Italian World War II pilots
Italian World War II bomber pilots
Vittorio
Regia Aeronautica personnel of World War II
Writers from Milan